is a Japanese footballer  currently playing for FC Tokyo in J1 League.

Club statistics
Updated to 19 July 2022.

1Includes Promotion Playoffs to J1.

Honours

Club
FC Tokyo
J.League Cup : 2020

References

External links
Profile at Montedio Yamagata

1987 births
Living people
Kansai University alumni
Association football people from Osaka Prefecture
People from Suita
Japanese footballers
J1 League players
J2 League players
Kyoto Sanga FC players
Ehime FC players
Montedio Yamagata players
FC Tokyo players
Association football goalkeepers